Burns Run is a  long 1st order tributary to Montgomery Run in Clearfield County, Pennsylvania.

Course 
Burns Run rises about 3 miles east of Rockton, Pennsylvania, and then flows generally north-northwest to join Montgomery Run about 2.5 miles northeast of Rockton.

Watershed 
 Burns Run drains  of area, receives about 45.3 in/year of precipitation, has a wetness index of 430.05, and is about 93% forested.

See also 
 List of Pennsylvania Rivers

References 

Rivers of Pennsylvania
Rivers of Clearfield County, Pennsylvania